Sony malware may refer to:

 Sony BMG CD copy protection scandal
 Extended Copy Protection
 MediaMax CD-3
 Macrovision CDS-200

See also
 OtherOS - PS3 Feature promised by Sony